Highway 5 is a  north–south route in southern British Columbia, Canada. Highway 5 connects the southern Trans-Canada route (Highway 1) with the northern Trans-Canada/Yellowhead route (Highway 16), providing the shortest land connection between Vancouver and Edmonton. Despite the entire route being signed as part of the Yellowhead Highway, the portion of Highway 5 south of Kamloops is also known as the Coquihalla Highway while the northern portion is known as the Southern Yellowhead Highway. The Coquihalla section was a toll road until 2008.

Although the Yellowhead Highway system is considered part of the Trans-Canada Highway network, Highway 5 is not represented with a Trans-Canada marker. Regardless, Highway 5 is designated as a core route of Canada's National Highway System.

Route description

Coquihalla Highway 

Between Hope and Kamloops, Highway 5 is known as the Coquihalla Highway (colloquially "the Coq"; pronounced "coke"). The Coquihalla approximately traces through the Cascade Mountains the route of the former Kettle Valley Railway, which existed between 1912 and 1958. The pass is named Kw'ikw'iya:la in the Halq'emeylem language used by the Stó꞉lō, which means "stingy container" and refers specifically to a fishing rock near the mouth of what is now known as the Coquihalla River. According to Stó:lō oral history, the skw'exweq (water babies, underwater people) who inhabit a pool close by the rock, would swim out and pull the salmon off the spears, allowing only certain fisherman to catch the salmon."

Exit numbers on the Coquihalla are a continuation of those on Highway 1 west of Hope as it is an extension of the freeway that starts in Horseshoe Bay.  north of Othello, after passing through five interchanges, Highway 5 reaches the landmark Great Bear snow shed.
 Coquihalla Pass. Highway 5 was the only highway in British Columbia to have tolls; a typical passenger vehicle toll was C$10.  Now free to drive, at the Coquihalla Lakes junction, the highway crosses from the Fraser Valley Regional District into the Thompson-Nicola Regional District.  and five interchanges north of the former toll plaza. The Coquihalla Highway then enters the city of Merritt, which is accessed by two interchanges, both of which also provide access to Highway 5A, Highway 97C and Highway 8.

After exiting Merritt the highway climbs up a long steep hill towards another highpoint  – the Surrey Lake Summit – It pass through three interchanges along this section. A diamond interchange at Exit 336 provides an important turn off to Logan Lake on Highway 97D and Lac le Jeune. Shortly after the junction it descends into the city of Kamloops where it meets Highways 1 and 97 at a trumpet interchange.

Kamloops 
Highway 5 continues east for  concurrently with Highways 1 and 97, through Kamloops. This stretch of road, which carries 97 South and 5 North on the same lanes (and vice versa), is the only wrong-way concurrency in British Columbia. This section is mostly an urban freeway with a speed limit of  it passes through 5 interchanges connecting to the core area of Kamloops before the concurrency splits and Highway 5 exits off the road to the north in a complex 5 way interchange.

After leaving the concurrency it immediately crosses the South Thompson River and enters a First Nations Reserve, temporarily leaving Kamloops city limits. A particularly important intersection is the signal lights at Halston Drive, which is one of only two access points to the north half of Kamloops. Highway 5 re-enters the city at the Rayleigh community, where it passes two busy at-grade, but not signallized intersections; traffic volumes steadily decrease as it gets farther from the core area of Kamloops. Heffley Creek indicates the northern boundary of Kamloops, the exit to Sun Peaks resort is at the same turn off. Traffic volumes thin out at that exit and shortly afterwards Highway 5 narrows to a 2 lane undivided road.

Southern Yellowhead Highway 
It is largely a two-lane undivided road, with some rare three- or four-lane sections for passing, although work has been constantly underway (especially in the Heffley Creek–Clearwater section) to create more passing opportunities. Traffic volume on this section of highway is low compared to the Coquihalla and Kamloops sections of Highway 5. In its whole length there is only one traffic signal, which is in the town of Valemount. Services for drivers are provided in the major towns.

It passes an important junction for Adams Lake in the settlement of Louis Creek before entering the town Barriere. North of Barriere it encounters a junction with Highway 24 in the village of Little Fort.  north of Little Fort, while continuing to follow the North Thompson and the CN Railway, Highway 5 reaches the resort community of Clearwater where a roundabout provides access to Wells Gray Provincial Park. Highway 5 proceeds northeast for another , passing Vavenby and Avola  to the community of Blue River: a popular heliskiing location. From there it proceeds  further north through the heart of the Columbia Mountains. It crosses a low divide between the Thompson River and Fraser River drainages entering the Regional District of Fraser-Fort George. It soon passes through the community of Valemount where a traffic signal is located. Next it passes Tête Jaune Cache and crosses the Fraser River, after which it immediately meets Highway 16 in a partial interchange; making its northern terminus.

History

The current Highway 5 is not the first highway in B.C. to have this designation. From 1941 to 1953, the section of present-day Highway 97, Highway 97A, and Highway 97B, between Kaleden, just south of Penticton, and Salmon Arm, was formerly Highway 5. In 1953, the '5' designation was moved to designate Princeton-Merritt-Kamloops Highway (present-day Highway 5A) to north of Kamloops; by 1960 Highway 5 was extended north to Tête Jaune Cache and subsequently paved. In 1970, Highway 5 between Kamloops and Tête Jaune Cache was designated as the South Yellowhead Highway and signed with the Yellowhead Highway shield, while the section south of Kamloops was still signed with the standard British Columbia highway shield.

In the 1960s, the Merritt Board of Trade began lobbying the B.C. government for a new highway route to Hope, including a vehicle caravan that was staged eight times starting in 1963, over the abandoned Kettle Valley Railway grade, in order draw attention to the potential of this route. Surveying commenced in 1973 and in 1979 the first construction contract was issued for  section of highway between Nicolum Creek and Peers Creek near Hope; however, work progressed slowly until 1984 when Premier Bill Bennett announced that the project would be fast-tracked so it could be completed to coincide with Expo 86. To ensure the project was completed on time, more than 10,000 people were needed to fill all of the jobs and more than 1,000 pieces of heavy equipment worked non-stop every day during the summer of 1985 to get it done. In order to offset the cost of fast-tracking construction, Phase 1 was made a toll highway, with a toll plaza constructed at the summit of Coquihalla Pass; was designed to accommodate 13 toll booths for 14 lanes of traffic.

The opening celebrations featured a ceremony in Hope followed by a convoy led by premier Bennett in an open air convertible that smashed through paper banners strung across the new highway lanes, stopped at the Coquihalla summit to dedicate a time capsule, and continued to Merritt for further celebrations. The total cost for the highway between Hope and Merritt was approximately $848 million. Phase 2 between Merritt and Kamloops opened in September 1987, re-routing Highway 5, while Phase 3 was opened in October 1990 and designated as Highway 97C. The three phases have been credited with transforming Merritt into an important transportation hub between the coast and interior, as well as significant growth in both Kamloops and the Okanagan due to improved accessibility.

In 2003, Premier Gordon Campbell announced the Liberal government would turn over toll revenue to a private operator, along with responsibility for operation, and maintenance of "the Coq". In response to strong opposition from the public, and numerous businesses, in the Interior of British Columbia, the provincial government shelved the move three months later.

On September 26, 2008, the provincial government permanently lifted the Coquihalla tolls, effective 1:00 pm that day. Subsequently, the toll station and signs were dismantled.

In 2011, the British Columbia government replaced the standard British Columbia Highway 5 shields with Yellowhead Highway 5 shields south of Kamloops, which at the time drew some concern that the Coquihalla Highway would be officially renamed.

In June 2016, the province implemented a variable speed limit corridor around the Coquhalla Summit Park to increase safety during adverse conditions.

Accidents and weather 
Signs along the Coquihalla Highway frequently warn drivers to be aware of sudden changes in weather. While road maintenance strives to keep the roads as clear as possible, it is not unheard of for the highway to shut down, sometimes with travellers forced to stay overnight in their cars.

According to ICBC there were 32 fatal crashes between 2004 and 2013, and an estimated 400-500 accidents occur during the winter seasons.  Global News listed the stretch between Merritt and Hope as one of the deadliest highways in BC.   DriveBC keeps up to date with reports on Coquihalla Highway conditions, including live webcams in several locations.

Owing to its reputation, Highway 5 is featured predominantly in the reality docuseries Highway Thru Hell, which follows a group of towing companies that operate in the Interior and Highway 5.

On November 14, 2021, a major storm in southern British Columbia damaged sections of the Coquihalla Highway and other routes in the area. The heavy amount of rain eventually caused several large washouts at multiple points along the highway, including the destruction of multiple bridges. Initial repair estimates include temporary reopenings consisting of temporary bridges, operational for early 2022 with full repair completed in September 2022. As a result of the washout events, the Canadian Forces Cormorant helicopters completed rescue evacuations of stranded motorists on the highway.

On December 20, 2021, the Coquihalla Highway was reopened to essential traffic, with non- essential traffic being diverted towards Highway 99.
On Wednesday, January 19, 2022, the Coquihalla Highway was reopened to non- essential traffic from Hope to Merritt.

The highway has since been fully reopened, allowing full traffic from Hope to Kamloops.

Exit list
From south to north, the following intersections are observed along Highway 5:

Gallery

References

External links

 7 Things You Need to Know BEFORE Driving the Coquihalla and High Mountain Passes

005
05
Freeways in British Columbia
Nicola Country
Thompson Country
Trans-Canada Highway
British Columbia 5
Transport in Kamloops
Highways in the Okanagan
Former toll roads in Canada